Gemazocine (R-15,497), also known as cyclogemine, is a non-selective opioid antagonist of the benzomorphan class. It may have partial agonist properties at some of the opioid receptors, such as at the kappa receptor (as it induces dysphoric effects in humans), but seems to be generally antagonistic in its actions.

References

Benzomorphans
Kappa-opioid receptor agonists
Mu-opioid receptor antagonists